Sysenvatnet is a lake in the municipality of Eidfjord in Vestland county, Norway. The lake is dammed on the south end by a large stone embankment, and the lake is used as the main reservoir for the Sima Hydroelectric Power Station. The Sysen Dam can easily be seen from Norwegian National Road 7, which runs near the southern shore of the lake.

See also
List of lakes in Norway

References

Eidfjord
Lakes of Vestland
Reservoirs in Norway